Styloptygma is a genus of sea snails, marine gastropod mollusks in the family Pyramidellidae, the pyrams and their allies.

Species
Species within the genus Styloptygma include:
 Styloptygma aciculina (Souverbie, 1865) 
 Styloptygma acuminatum (Gould, 1861 in 1859-61)
 Styloptygma beatrix Melvill, 1910
 Styloptygma cereum A. Adams, 1863
 Styloptygma clymene Melvill, 1918 
 Styloptygma cometes Melvill, 1910
 Styloptygma fromageti Saurin, 1959
 Styloptygma gibbum A. Adams, 1863
 Styloptygma hataisinkishii Nomura, 1938
 Styloptygma jaculum (Melvill & Standen, 1896)
 Styloptygma lacteolum Preston, 1903
 Styloptygma larvula A. Adams, 1863
 Styloptygma luteum (Garrett, 1872)
 Styloptygma onagawaensis (Nomura, 1938)
 Styloptygma pupiformis (A. Adams, 1860)
 Styloptygma taeniatum A. Adams, 1863
 Styloptygma titizimanum (Nomura, 1939)
 Styloptygma typicum (Tryon, 1886)
 Styloptygma versicolor (Melvill & Standen, 1897)
Species brought into synonymy
 Styloptygma acuminata [sic]: synonym of Styloptygma acuminatum (Gould, 1861)
 Styloptygma andamanensis Preston, 1908: synonym of Odostomia andamanensis (Preston, 1908)
 Styloptygma aurantiaca Angas, 1867: synonym of Syrnola aurantiaca (Angas, 1867) (original combination)
 Styloptygma lacteola [sic]: synonym of Styloptygma lacteolum Preston, 1903
 Styloptygma lendix Adams A. 1863: synonym of Syrnola lendix (A. Adams, 1863)
 Styloptygma lutea [sic]: synonym of Styloptygma luteum (Garrett, 1873)
 Styloptygma onagawaensis [sic]: synonym of Styloptygma onagawaense (Nomura, 1938)
 Styloptygma queenslandica (Laseron, 1959): synonym of Styloptygma versicolor (Melvill & Standen, 1897)
 Styloptygma serotina [sic]: synonym of Tibersyrnola serotina (A. Adams, 1863)
 Styloptygma serotinum (A. Adams, 1863): synonym of Tibersyrnola serotina (A. Adams, 1863)
 Styloptygma taeniata [sic]: synonym of Styloptygma taeniatum (A. Adams, 1863)
 Styloptygma terebroides Kuroda & Kawamoto in Kawamoto & Tanabe, 1956: synonym of Puposyrnola terebroides (Kuroda & Kawamoto, 1956)
 Styloptygma titizimana [sic]: synonym of Styloptygma titizimanum (Nomura, 1939)
 Styloptygma typica [sic]: synonym of Styloptygma typicum (Tryon, 1886)

References

 Gofas, S.; Le Renard, J.; Bouchet, P. (2001). Mollusca. in: Costello, M.J. et al. (Ed.) (2001). European register of marine species: a check-list of the marine species in Europe and a bibliography of guides to their identification. Collection Patrimoines Naturels. 50: pp. 180–213.

External links
 To World Register of Marine Species

Pyramidellidae